This partial list of city nicknames in India compiles the aliases, sobriquets and slogans that cities in India are known by (or have been known by) historically, officially, or unofficially, to locals, outsiders, or their tourism chambers of commerce.

Andhra Pradesh and Telangana

Bihar

Gujarat

Jharkhand

Karnataka

Kerala

Rajasthan

Tamil Nadu

Uttarakhand

Uttar Pradesh

West Bengal

Notes

References 

India
Nicknames